Chlormadinone caproate (CMC) is a progestin and a progestogen ester which was studied for potential use in combined injectable contraceptives but was never marketed. It was assessed in combination with estradiol valerate at doses of 80 mg and 3 mg, respectively. In addition to chlormadinone acetate (CMA), analogues of CMC include gestonorone caproate, hydroxyprogesterone caproate, medroxyprogesterone caproate, megestrol caproate, and methenmadinone caproate.

See also
 List of progestogen esters § Esters of 17α-hydroxyprogesterone derivatives

References

Abandoned drugs
Caproate esters
Chloroarenes
Diketones
Pregnanes
Progestogen esters
Progestogens